Lakes Region Community College (LRCC) is a public community college in Laconia, New Hampshire. It is part of the Community College System of New Hampshire.

Academics
The college offers 29 associate degree programs in fields such as Nursing, Fire Technology, Energy Services, Media Arts, Culinary Arts, Automotive, and Marine Technology, as well as dozens of shorter term certificate programs.

History
In the heart of New Hampshire's Lakes Region, the college was established as Laconia College in 1967. The main campus underwent a physical expansion in 1980, adding the Robert H. Turner wing to its facility. In September 2005, the Center for Arts and Technology was completed and is home to Computer Technologies, Electrical Technologies, Fine Arts, and Graphic Design and Printing Technology. In September 2013, LRCC opened the state-of-the-art Health and Science Building (attached to the Center for Arts and Technology) which added  of usable space. The new Health and Science Building houses Fire Science, Nursing, Science laboratories, and new student space. There are four new modern science and hi-tech Nursing labs. The new building also houses two new Fire Science labs, faculty offices, and a 140-seat mini-auditorium.

References

External links

 Official website

Buildings and structures in Laconia, New Hampshire
Community colleges in New Hampshire
University System of New Hampshire
Educational institutions established in 1967
1967 establishments in New Hampshire
Education in Belknap County, New Hampshire